Promecotarsus is a genus of true weevils in the beetle family Curculionidae. There are at least three described species in Promecotarsus.

Species
These three species belong to the genus Promecotarsus:
 Promecotarsus densus Casey, 1892
 Promecotarsus fumatus Casey, 1892
 Promecotarsus maritimus Casey, 1892

References

Further reading

 
 
 

Curculioninae
Articles created by Qbugbot